Coincidence and Likely Stories (1992) is an album by Buffy Sainte-Marie, her first in sixteen years, during which time she had been raising her son and working on the children's television show Sesame Street. The album itself was largely recorded at Sainte-Marie's home before being sent to producer Chris Birkett for the final production and mixing in London.

The album showed her continuing with the electronic music she had first developed on Illuminations and the tribal themes seen on Sweet America, her last pre-retirement album.

Although the album received some very favourable reviews and was often seen as her best work since Illuminations, it failed to make any impression in the United States. Coincidence and Likely Stories became her only album to chart in the UK, and featured two minor hit singles there.

The album title itself comes from the first line of the song "Disinformation":

 Coincidence and likely stories/they dog your trail like a pack of lies

"Bury My Heart at Wounded Knee" was covered by Indigo Girls on its album 1200 Curfews (1995).

Track listing 
All songs composed by Buffy Sainte-Marie except where noted.

 "The Big Ones Get Away" - 3:49
 "Fallen Angels" - 3:08
 "Bad End" - 4:24
 "Emma Lee" - 4:02
 "Starwalker" - 3:05
 "The Priests of the Golden Bull" - 3:51
 "Disinformation" - 3:48
 "Getting Started" - 4:31
 "I'm Going Home" - 3:24
 "Bury My Heart at Wounded Knee" - 5:16
 "Goodnight" (Cliff Eberhardt) - 3:50

Charts

References 

Coincidence and Likely Stories
Coincidence and Likely Stories
Chrysalis Records albums